Nahangudi is a village located near Koothanallur, Tiruvarur District, in the state of Tamil Nadu, India. An estimated 100 families reside in the settlement. Majority of people living in the settlement are engaged in agriculture based occupations.

Transportation
Nahangudi is located between Koothanallur and Vadapathimangalam. People can reach Nahangudi by buses operated by Tamil Nadu State Transport Corporation. 
The closest to the town is Tiruchirappalli, which is 100 km away.
The closest railway stations are Mannargudi railway station and Thiruvarur Junction railway station which are 15 km away.

Education
There are two schools:
 Alavudeen Aided Primary School
 Dr. Al Ameen A.R. Matriculation School

References

External links
Wikimapia link: Nahangudi

Cities and towns in Tiruvarur district